Boxed is a box set by the British pop duo Eurythmics. It was released on 14 November 2005 by RCA Records and contains eight digitally remastered albums including 43 bonus tracks.

Many of the bonus tracks have originally appeared as B-sides and extra tracks on various single releases (although the selection was not exhaustive). A selection of cover versions, recorded by Eurythmics for the aborted "TV Planet" project, are also included.

Included albums
Boxed features all eight studio albums originally released by RCA Records remastered and expanded.

The following albums are included in Boxed:

In the Garden (1981)
Sweet Dreams (Are Made of This) (1983)
Touch (1983)
Be Yourself Tonight (1985)
Revenge (1986)
Savage (1987)
We Too Are One (1989)
Peace (1999)

The EP Touch Dance (exclusively consisting of remixes from the  1983 Touch album), the soundtrack album 1984 (For the Love of Big Brother) (released through Virgin Records – now an EMI sublabel – rather than RCA Records), and the live album Live 1983–1989 are not included in the set.

Each expanded release includes a selection of B-sides, and/or remixes, and/or live tracks.  Also scattered across seven of the eight expanded releases are a selection of seven cover songs from a never-realized project called TV Planet.  Announced in early 1986, TV Planet was to have been an animated television show which took place on a world that had forgotten about music; the lead characters would re-introduce music to this world.  The show never got past the planning stages.

While the recording dates of the TV Planet cover songs are not detailed anywhere in the package, they would appear to date from anywhere between 1983 and 1988, or later.  "Satellite Of Love" initially made its appearance on a cassette-only compilation of Eurythmics rarities in late 1983, and at least one track, "Last Night I Dreamt That Somebody Loved Me", could not have been recorded any earlier than late 1987, as the original recording by The Smiths was issued in September of that year.

Track listings

In the Garden
 "English Summer"
 "Belinda"
 "Take Me to Your Heart"
 "She's Invisible Now"
 "Your Time Will Come"
 "Caveman Head"
 "Never Gonna Cry Again"
 "All the Young (People of Today)"
 "Sing-Sing"
 "Revenge"
 "Le Sinistre" – Bonus Track
 "Heartbeat Heartbeat" – Bonus Track
 "Never Gonna Cry Again" (Live) – Bonus Track
 "4/4 in Leather" (Live) – Bonus Track
 "Take Me to Your Heart" (Live) – Bonus Track

Sweet Dreams (Are Made of This)
 "Love Is a Stranger"
 "I've Got an Angel"
 "Wrap It Up"
 "I Could Give You (A Mirror)"
 "The Walk"
 "Sweet Dreams (Are Made of This)"
 "Jennifer"
 "This Is the House"
 "Somebody Told Me"
 "This City Never Sleeps"
 "Home Is Where the Heart Is" – Bonus Track
 "Monkey Monkey" – Bonus Track
 "Baby's Gone Blue" – Bonus Track
 "Sweet Dreams" (Hot Remix) – Bonus Track
 "Love Is a Stranger" (Coldcut remix) – Bonus Track
 "Satellite of Love" (Lou Reed) – Previously Unreleased – taken from the aborted "TV Planet" project - Bonus Track

Touch
 "Here Comes the Rain Again"
 "Regrets"
 "Right by Your Side"
 "Cool Blue"
 "Who's That Girl?"
 "The First Cut"
 "Aqua"
 "No Fear, No Hate, No Pain (No Broken Hearts)"
 "Paint A Rumour"
 "You Take Some Lentils and You Take Some Rice" – Bonus Track
 "ABC (Freeform)" – Bonus Track
 "Plus Something Else" – Bonus Track
 "Paint a Rumour" (Long Version) – Bonus Track
 "Who's That Girl" (Live) – Bonus Track
 "Here Comes the Rain Again" (Live) – Previously Unreleased – Bonus Track
 "Fame" (David Bowie/Carlos Alomar/John Lennon) – Previously Unreleased – taken from the aborted "TV Planet" project - Bonus Track

Be Yourself Tonight
 "Would I Lie to You?"
 "There Must Be an Angel (Playing with My Heart)"
 "I Love You Like a Ball & Chain"
 "Sisters Are Doin' It for Themselves"
 "Conditioned Soul"
 "Adrian"
 "It's Alright (Baby's Coming Back)"
 "Here Comes That Sinking Feeling"
 "Better to Have Lost in Love (Than Never to Have Loved at All)"
 "Grown Up Girls" – Bonus Track
 "Tous les garçons et les filles" – Bonus Track
 "Sisters Are Doin' It for Themselves" (ET Mix) Bonus Track
 "Would I Lie to You?" (12" extended mix) – Bonus Track
 "Conditioned Soul" (Live) – Previously Unreleased - Bonus Track
 "Hello, I Love You" (Jim Morrison/Robby Krieger/Ray Manzarek/John Densmore) – Previously Unreleased – taken from the aborted "TV Planet" project - Bonus Track

Revenge
 "Missionary Man"
 "Thorn in My Side"
 "When Tomorrow Comes"
 "The Last Time"
 "The Miracle of Love"
 "Let's Go"
 "Take Your Pain Away"
 "A Little of You"
 "In This Town"
 "I Remember You"
 "When Tomorrow Comes" (Extended version) – Bonus Track
 "Thorn in My Side" (Extended version) – Bonus Track
 "Missionary Man" (Extended version) – Bonus Track
 "When Tomorrow Comes" (Live Acoustic Version) – Previously Unreleased – Bonus Track
 "Revenge 2" – taken from the original soundtrack "Rooftops" - Bonus Track
 "My Guy" (Smokey Robinson/Ronald White) – Previously Unreleased – taken from the aborted "TV Planet" project - Bonus Track

Savage
 "Beethoven (I Love to Listen to)"
 "I've Got a Lover (Back in Japan)"
 "Do You Want to Break Up?"
 "You Have Placed a Chill in My Heart"
 "Shame"
 "Savage"
 "I Need a Man"
 "Put the Blame on Me"
 "Heaven"
 "Wide Eyed Girl"
 "I Need You"
 "Brand New Day"
 "Beethoven" (Extended Philharmonic Version) – Bonus Track
 "Shame" (Dance Mix) – Bonus Track
 "I Need a Man" (Macho Mix) – Bonus Track
 "I Need You" (Live) – Previously Unreleased – Bonus Track
 "Come Together" (Lennon/McCartney) – Previously Unreleased – taken from the aborted "TV Planet" project - Bonus Track

We Too Are One
 "We Two Are One"
 "The King and Queen of America"
 "(My My) Baby's Gonna Cry"
 "Don't Ask Me Why"
 "Angel"
 "Revival"
 "You Hurt Me (And I Hate You)"
 "Sylvia"
 "How Long"
 "When the Day Goes Down"
 "Precious" – Bonus Track
 "See No Evil" – Bonus Track
 "The King and Queen of America" (Dance Remix) – Bonus Track
 "Angel" (Choir Version) – Bonus Track
 "Last Night I Dreamt That Somebody Loved Me" (Morrissey/Marr) – Previously Unavailable – taken from the aborted "TV Planet" project - Bonus Track

Peace
 "17 Again" - alternate mix compared to 1999 release
 "I Saved the World Today" - alternate mix compared to 1999 release
 "Power to the Meek" - alternate mix compared to 1999 release
 "Beautiful Child"
 "Anything But Strong"
 "Peace Is Just a Word"
 "I've Tried Everything" - alternate mix compared to 1999 release
 "I Want It All"
 "My True Love"
 "Forever" - alternate mix compared to 1999 release
 "Lifted"
 "Beautiful Child" (Acoustic Version) – Previously Unreleased - Bonus Track
 "17 Again" (Acoustic Version) – Previously Unreleased - Bonus Track
 "I Saved the World Today" (Acoustic Version) – Previously Unreleased - Bonus Track
 "Something in the Air" (Speedy Keen) – Previously Unreleased – taken from the aborted "TV Planet" project - Bonus Track

See also
Eurythmics discography
2005 in music

Notes and references

Eurythmics compilation albums
Albums produced by David A. Stewart
Albums produced by Jimmy Iovine
Albums produced by Conny Plank
2005 compilation albums